Maurice Ligot (9 December 1927 – 29 October 2022) was a French civil administrator and politician. He served in the National Assembly from 1973 to 1975 and again from 1978 to 2002 in Maine-et-Loire's 5th constituency.

Biography

Youth and education
Maurice was the son of Maurice Alexandre Ligot and Madeleine Rousseau. He studied at Sciences Po and the École nationale d'administration.

Career
Ligot began working for the Secretary-General for African and Malagasy Affairs, Jacques Foccart, one of the closest advisors of President Charles de Gaulle. He was subsequently chief of staff for Minister of the Interior Roger Frey. With the exception of an appointment by President Valéry Giscard d'Estaing as Secretary of State of Civil Service from 1976 to 1978, he was a deputy of the National Assembly from 1973 to 2002.

At the end of the 19th Century, Célestin Port noted that the commune of Cholet did not have a museum or a library. This did not change until Ligot's mayorship, with a permanent library opening in 1984 and the  opening in 1993. Additionally, a new town hall was opened in 1976 and a new hospice opened the following year.

Death
Maurice Ligot died in Cholet on 29 October 2022, at the age of 94.

Publications
Les accords de coopération entre la France et les États africains et malgache d'expression française (1964)
Un territoire, une passion (1993)
1965-1995, l'audace d'une ville : Cholet (1995)
 Contributions parlementaires pour l'élargissement de l'Union européenne : Chypre, Lituanie et Turquie : Rapport d'information de l'Assemblée nationale (2002)
Osez entreprendre (2003)
Un maire, une ville (2015)
Édouard Corniglion-Molinier, un paladin au xxe siècle (2019)

References

1927 births
2022 deaths
National Centre of Independents and Peasants politicians
Union for French Democracy politicians
Deputies of the 7th National Assembly of the French Fifth Republic
Deputies of the 8th National Assembly of the French Fifth Republic
Deputies of the 9th National Assembly of the French Fifth Republic
Deputies of the 10th National Assembly of the French Fifth Republic
Deputies of the 11th National Assembly of the French Fifth Republic
French Ministers of Civil Service
École nationale d'administration alumni
Sciences Po alumni
People from Niort